The Godolphin Mile is a Group 2 flat Thoroughbred horse race in the United Arab Emirates for Southern Hemisphere three-year-old horses and Northern Hemisphere four-year-olds. It is contested on dirt over a distance of 1,600 metres (approximately 8 furlongs) at Meydan Racecourse in Dubai.

Inaugurated in 1994 as the Nad Al Sheba Mile, and renamed in 2000, the race takes place annually during the Dubai World Cup Night in late March and currently offers a purse of US$1 million.

Records
Speed  record: 
 1:36:82 – Calming Influence (2010) Tapeta
 1:34.91 – Lend a Hand (1999) dirt

Most wins:
 2 – Lost Soldier (1994, 1995)
 2 – Firebreak (2003, 2004)

Most wins by a jockey:
 7 – Frankie Dettori (1998, 1999, 2003, 2004, 2009, 2011, 2012)

Most wins by a trainer:
 10 – Saeed bin Suroor (1996, 1997, 1998, 1999, 2001, 2003, 2004, 2009, 2011, 2012)

Most wins by an owner:
 8 – Godolphin Racing (1998, 2001, 2003, 2004, 2009, 2010, 2011, 2012)

Winners of the Godolphin Mile

See also
 List of United Arab Emirates horse races

References
Racing Post:

Flat horse races for three-year-olds
Flat horse races for four-year-olds
Horse races in the United Arab Emirates
Recurring events established in 1994
Nad Al Sheba Racecourse
1994 establishments in the United Arab Emirates